is a male-only high school located in Nishinomiya, Hyōgo Prefecture, Japan. It was founded as a middle school in 1917 by Komakichiro Iga, with support from the Tatsu-uma family, owners of the Hakushika brand of Japanese Refined Sake, since 1920. It was reorganized into junior and senior high schools under the educational reforms of 1948. Many of its alumni have succeeded in fields such as business, medicine and academic.

Rankings  
According to the ranking of Hensachi, which uses adjusted standard deviation scores to measure academic ability in Japan, the Koyo Gakuin High School constitutes the second group with a deviation value of 73, following the top group of schools with deviation values of 74 constituted by Nada High School and Junior & Senior High School at Komaba, University of Tsukuba.

Notable alumni 
Notable alumni include: 
 Nobutada Saji, CEO of Suntory Ltd.
 Kazuhiko Nishi, founder of ASCII Corporation
 Hidesaburou Hanafusa, Professor Emeritus, Rockefeller University
 Kaoru Betto, baseball player

References

External links 
 Koyo Gakuin High School 
High schools in Hyōgo Prefecture